The Collector of Bedford Street is a 2002 documentary film about director Alice Elliott's neighbor, Larry Selman, a community activist and fundraiser who had an intellectual disability.

Film content

When Larry's primary caregiver becomes unable to care for him, his New York City neighborhood community rallies together to protect his independent lifestyle by establishing an adult trust fund in his behalf.

Larry is the beneficiary of an Adult Supplemental Needs Trust, which was sponsored by the Bedford-Barrow-Commerce (BBC) Block Association through the UJA-Federation Community Trust for Disabled Adults. The BBC's sponsorship of Larry marked the first time a group outside of a beneficiary's family established an Adult Supplemental Needs Trust.

The Collector of Bedford Street DVD is being used by Kiwanis International for training Key Leaders in service around the world.

Nominations and awards
The Collector of Bedford Street has screened at more than 70 film festivals around the world, including the Black Maria Film Festival, Aspen Short Film festival and Heartland Festival.   The film was nominated for the 2002 Academy Award for Best Documentary (Short Subject).

See also

List of documentary films
 List of American films of 2003

References

External links
 NPR article about Larry Selman, accessed on 29 Oct. 2013
  The Collector of Bedford Street at the Internet Movie Database
 The Collector of Bedford Street at New Day Films

2002 films
2002 short documentary films
American short documentary films
Documentary films about mental health
2000s English-language films
2000s American films